The Alaparma Baldo was an unusual two-seat light monoplane produced in Italy shortly after World War II. Designed by Adriano Mantelli, it featured an egg-shaped fuselage with cabin doors that hinged upwards and to the back. The conventional tailplane with single fin and rudder was carried on twin booms, either side of a pusher engine installation.  The undercarriage consisted of a single mainwheel under the fuselage pod, a small tailwheel not far behind it, and outrigger wheels on the wingtips.

Variants
 AM.65 with 65hp Walter Mikron piston engine
 AM.75 with 75hp Praga D engine

Operators

Italian Air Force operated 10 aircraft until 1951

Specifications (AM.75)

References

 
 
 luftfahrt-archiv.de

Single-engined pusher aircraft
1940s Italian civil utility aircraft
Baldo
Mid-wing aircraft
Aircraft first flown in 1949
Twin-boom aircraft